Mike's New Car is a 2002 American computer animated comedy short film, starring the protagonists from Monsters, Inc., Mike Wazowski and James P. "Sulley" Sullivan. Directed by Pete Docter and Roger L. Gould, it is the first Pixar short to use dialogue and the first to take characters and situations from a previously established work.

The short premiered on September 17, 2002, and was included in the DVD and VHS release of Monsters, Inc. It was nominated for a 2002 Academy Award for Best Animated Short Film.

Plot
Mike gets a new six-wheel drive car and happily insists on showing it off to Sulley, who is confused about what happened to his old car, but Mike likes his new car. Unfortunately for Mike, anything that can go wrong does go wrong. Sulley plays with the adjustable power seat until an annoyed Mike snaps at him to knock it off ("WILL YOU CUT IT OUT!?!?"). Mike starts the engine and hears the seatbelt reminder sound chiming.

Although Sulley manages to get his seatbelt on easily, Mike finds his seatbelt stuck and accidentally locks himself out of the car while falling out in an attempt to unstick it. Mike instructs Sulley to push a button so he can get back in. Sulley, confused by the massive amount of buttons on the dashboard, pushes the one that opens the hood. When Mike goes over to close it, he cannot reach it. Sulley helps him close the hood but accidentally closes it on Mike's fingers causing him to scream in pain. Sulley helps Mike get free by pushing the button again only for Mike sending himself into the air and onto the engine motors and trap him in the engine compartment completely.

Mike calls Sulley on his cell phone and instructs him to open the hood again. When he does this, Mike manages to escape and quickly closes the hood. When he reenters the car, he is annoyed by the continuous seatbelt reminder tone still chiming. Mike manages to put his seatbelt on, but the windshield wipers randomly turn on, annoying him even more. As Sulley tries to help, Mike tells him not to touch anything and decides to do it himself. Mike pushes a button that loudly plays conga music on the car's stereo system and pushes more buttons that launches the entire car into chaotic malfunction. Jerry Slugworth appears looking at the car and then runs away in fear.

At this point, Mike finally ends the chaos by pulling the key out of the engine. However, Sulley breaks the rearview mirror in an attempt to realign it. Mike gets angry and kicks Sulley out of the car, before speeding away, resulting in the car's destruction. Sulley says: "Huh, that's weird. The airbag didn't go off." Right on cue, the airbag immediately bursts, and its power sends Mike flying. Sulley quickly catches him, who sadly states that he misses his old car. Following this, Mike reminisces about his old car before agreeing to walk to work as the end credits roll.

Voice cast
 Billy Crystal as Michael "Mike" Wazowski
 John Goodman as James P. "Sulley" Sullivan

Home media
Mike's New Car was released on September 17, 2002, attached as a bonus feature on the Monsters, Inc. DVD and VHS release. The DVD release features commentary by "Docter and Gould", which turn out to be the directors' young children. The short was also released on November 10, 2009, on the Monsters, Inc. Blu-ray.

References

External links

 
 Building Mike's New Car Co-director/creative director of shorts department Roger Gould and story artists Rob Gibbs and Jeff Pidgeon discuss how they followed up the CGI adventures of Mike and Sulley by Building Mike's New Car.
 
 

2002 short films
2002 computer-animated films
2000s American animated films
2000s animated short films
2002 comedy films
Films directed by Pete Docter
American monster movies
Pixar short films
American horror short films
Animated films about automobiles
Monsters, Inc.
2000s monster movies
Films with screenplays by Pete Docter
2000s English-language films
American animated short films
American comedy short films